The term belted magnum or belted case refers to any cartridge, but generally a rifle cartridge, with a shell casing that has a pronounced "belt" around its base that continues 2–4 mm past the extractor groove.

This design originated with the British gunmaker Holland & Holland for the purpose of headspacing certain more powerful cartridges. Non-shouldered (non-"bottlenecked") magnum rifle cartridges especially could be pushed too far into the chamber and thus cause catastrophic failure of the gun when fired with excessive headspace. The addition of the belt to the casing prevented over-insertion.  An example of an American adaption of this practice is seen in cartridges like the .458 Winchester Magnum, also a shoulderless heavy magnum.

Many subsequent cartridges of "magnum" nomenclature were based on the original .375 H&H cartridge, so over time the belt became something of a standardized attribute, expected as part of a "magnum" cartridge. Many cartridge designs of the last century include this belt, but do not really require it.

Since the beginning of the 21st century, there has been an ever growing trend toward beltless magnum cartridges, virtually all of which are heavily shouldered designs that obviate the original motivation for a belt.

References

Ammunition